This article details the Salford Red Devils's rugby league football club's 2020 season.

Fixtures and results 
  

All fixtures are subject to change

Challenge Cup 

Salford Red Devils's sixth round opener was due to be against the previous season's champions St Helens, to whom they were runners-up in the Grand Final. However, like all Round 6 ties, it was postponed and eventually cancelled due to the COVID-19 pandemic. Salford was one of a number of teams to receive a bye to the quarter finals.

Regular season 

All fixtures are subject to change

League standings

Notes

Player statistics

As of Round 7  (15 March 2020)

2020 squad

2020 transfers

Gains

Losses

References

External links

 
 Super League website

Salford Red Devils seasons
2020 in English rugby league
Super League XXV by club